The Krishna River is a river in the Deccan plateau and is the third-longest river in India, after the Ganges and Godavari. It is also the fourth-largest in terms of water inflows and river basin area in India, after the Ganges, Indus and Godavari. It is a major source of irrigation in the Indian states of Maharashtra, Karnataka, Telangana and Andhra Pradesh.

Course
From Mahabaleshwar it flows to the town of Wai and continues to travel east until it empties into the Bay of Bengal. The Krishna River passes through the Indian states of Maharashtra, Karnataka, Andhra Pradesh, and Telangana.

Tributaries

The Krishna River has 13 major tributaries. Its principal tributaries include the Ghataprabha River, Malaprabha River, Bhima River, Tungabhadra River and Musi River. The Bhima River is the longest tributary of the Krishna River.

Three tributaries Panchganga, Warna and Yerla meet Krishna river near Sangli. These places are considered very holy. It is said that Lord Dattatreya spent some of his days at Audumber on the banks of river Krishna.

The Krishna and Malaprabha rivers merge here. The Aikya Mantapa or the holy Samādhi of Basavanna, the founder of the Lingayat sect of Hindu religion along with Linga, which is believed to be self-born (Swayambhu), is here and river flow east towards Srisailam (another pilgrim center) Andhra Pradesh.

Sangameswaram of Kurnool district in Andhra Pradesh is a famous pilgrim center for Hindus where Tungabhadra and Bhavanasi rivers join the Krishna river. The Sangameswaram temple is now drowned in the Srisailam reservoir, and visible for devotees only during summer when the reservoir's water level comes down.

Krishna Basin

This large basin lies in the states of Karnataka (113,271 km2), Telangana, Andhra Pradesh (76,252 km2) and Maharashtra (69,425 km2). It is the fifth largest basin in India.

Most of this basin comprises rolling and undulating country, except for the western border, which is formed by an unbroken line of the Western Ghats. The important soil types found in the basin are black soils, red soils, laterite and lateritic soils, alluvium, mixed soils, red and black soils and saline and alkaline soils.

An average annual surface water potential of 78.1 km3 has been assessed in this basin. Out of this, 58.0 km3 is utilizable water. As the water availability in the Krishna river was becoming inadequate to meet the water demand, Godavari River is linked to the Krishna river by commissioning the Polavaram right bank canal with the help of Pattiseema lift scheme in the year 2015 to augment water availability to the Prakasam Barrage in Andhra Pradesh. The irrigation canals of Prakasam Barrage form part of National Waterway 4. The Krishna-Godavari delta known as "Rice Granary of India."

Places and temples

This river is revered by Hindus as sacred. The river is also believed to remove all sins of people by taking a bath in this river. The centre of attraction is the Krishna Pushkaram fair which is held once in twelve years on the banks of the Krishna river. There are many pilgrimage places in Maharashtra, Karnataka, Telangana and Andhra Pradesh on the course of the river.

The first holy place on the river Krishna is at Wai, known for the Mahaganpati Mandir and Kashivishweshwar temple. It has seven ghats along the river. Temples like Dattadeva temple, which is revered by the people of Maharashtra, are located on the banks of Krishna at Narsobawadi , Bhilawdi Audumbar near Sangli. Yadur is one of the important holy places in Karnataka which is located on the bank of Krishna. Veerabhadra temple is a famous temple. Many devotees visit this place from Maharashtra and Andhra Pradesh. Also, located on the banks of the river Krishna is the Sangameshwar Shiva temple at Haripur. Some of the other temples are the Kanaka Durga Temple in Vijayawada, Ramling temple near Sangli, Mallikarjuna Jyotirlinga (Srisailam), Amareshwara Swamy Temple, Vedadri Narasimha Temple, Vadapalli temple in Nalgonda, Dattadeva temple, and Sangameshwara Shiva temples at Alampur & Gadwal in Telangana.

Bhilawadi town in Maharashtra has a large stone structure constructed across Krishna river bank, also known as Krishna Ghat. This structure also includes one large and one small temple constructed in the middle of the river. This structure is believed to be constructed in 1779.

Flora and fauna

Wide spread area near to the Krishna river holds the rich flora and fauna. The last surviving Mangrove forests in the Krishna estuary have been declared as the Krishna Wildlife Sanctuary. The sanctuary is the home to the large number of resident and migratory birds. Fishing cats, otters, Estuarine crocodiles, spotted deer, sambar deer, blackbucks, snakes, lizards and jackals can also be spotted in the sanctuary. The sanctuary also supports rich vegetation with plants like Rhizophora, Avicennia, and Aegiceros. The following are few other wildlife sanctuaries located in the Krishna basin.

 Nagarjunsagar-Srisailam Tiger Reserve
 Rollapadu Wildlife Sanctuary
 Bhadra Wildlife Sanctuary
 Ghataprabha Bird Sanctuary
 Gudavi Bird Sanctuary
 Koyna Wildlife Sanctuary
 Radhanagari Wildlife Sanctuary
 Great Indian Bustard Sanctuary
 Chandoli National Park
 Kudremukh National Park
 Kasu Brahmananda Reddy National Park
 Mahavir Harina Vanasthali National Park
 Mrugavani National Park
 Pakhal Wildlife Sanctuary
 Ranibennur Blackbuck Sanctuary
 Shettihalli Wildlife Sanctuary
 Daroji Sloth Bear Sanctuary, Bellary

Waterfalls

The following are few other waterfalls located in the river basin

 Ethipothala on Chandravanka river which is the tributary of river Krishna river
 Godchinamalaki on Markandeya river a tributary of Ghataprabha
 Gokak on Ghataprabha
 Mallela Theertham

Bridges

The Krishna River is spanned by several bridges along its course, some of which are listed below.

 Krishna Bridge, Wai, Maharashtra – This bridge, which is located in the Dharmpuri Peth area of the town of Wai, is one of the oldest bridges that were built by the British in India. It spans the Krishna over nine kamans (arches) and is made of black rock. The bridge serves as a flood mark (when the water rises to the level of the road on the bridge) for the "Waikar" people.
 Irwin Bridge, Sangli – This is one of the oldest, historic and largest bridges over the Krishna that were built by the British. The Irwin Bridge, which is built of reddish stone, has two passages where one can climb down to the river in the middle of its span to view the water.
 Ankali Bridge, Sangli Maharashtra – This bridge is major link between Sangli and Kolhapur districts. At this point there are three bridge, one for railway and two for roadways. Out of two roadway bridge the one bridge in the direction towards Miraj was built in Nineteenth century under British Administration. It is still in operation. The railway bridge was constructed at the time of laying of Kolhapur to Pune rail link. The contractor for rail bridge was V. R. Ranade & Sons from Pune. The construction of this railway bridge and culverts on railway route in nearby region were constructed by them in year 1882–84.
 Kudachi – Ugar Railway bridge built by the British in 1891.
 B. Soundatti Bridge, Raibag – This is also one of the oldest bridges built during the British rule. This bridge connects Maharashtra to Karnataka state.
 Tangadagi Bridge, This is one of oldest bridges that connects the Bijapur and Bagalkot districts of Karnataka. God Neelambika Temple is there at the bank of Krishna River.
Chikkapadasalagi bridge, is one of the oldest bridge built in British era connects jamakhandi and vijayapur, 
 Jambagi Bridge, Jamkhandi : Recently built bridge connects Athani , Bijapur and Jamkhandi.
 Galagali Bridge of Galagali village, Bagalkot: very important bridge that connects many towns and villages of Bagalkot and Vijayapur districts.
 Krishna Bridge near Shakti Nagar, Raichur distrcit was built in the memory of the travel undertaken by Nawab Javvadjaha Bahadur, the prince of Hyderabad, to Raichur in early 20th century. The bridge was named after the prince as Sirat-e-joodi. The construction began in 1933 and completed in 1943

In October 2009, heavy floods occurred, isolating 350 villages and leaving millions homeless, which is believed to be first occurrence in 1000 years. The flood resulted in heavy damage to Kurnool, Mahabubnagar, Guntur, Krishna and Nalagonda Districts. The entire city of Kurnool was immersed in approximately  water for nearly 3 days.

Krishna river is the second largest east flowing river of the peninsula. The flood waters of Krishna and Godavari rivers can be fully utilized by exporting water to other east flowing peninsular rivers up to Vaigai River in Tamil Nadu by constructing a coastal reservoir on the Bay of Bengal sea area.

Water outflows to the sea
The yearly water outflows to the sea in a water year from 1 June 2003 to 31 May 2022 (19 years) are given below

Interstate water sharing

At present, the award of Bachawat tribunal dated 31 May 1976 is applicable for sharing the water available in the river among the riparian states. The Brijesh Kumar tribunal award given on 29 November 2013 is challenged by Andhra Pradesh in the Supreme Court and the case pending since then. The newly created state of Telangana also approached Supreme Court demanding a fresh tribunal hearing to secure its water needs on equitable basis.

Even though the river does not flow through Tamil Nadu, the Telugu Ganga Project is a canal system that brings Krishna river water to that state's capital city of Chennai with the agreement of all basin states.

Dams

There are many dams constructed across the Krishna river.

 Dhom Dam
 Hippargi barrage
 Almatti Dam
 Narayanpur Dam
 Bhima Dam
 Jurala Dam
 Srisailam Dam
 Nagarjuna Sagar Dam
 Nagarjuna Sagar tail pond
 Pulichinthala Dam
 Prakasam Barrage
 Tungabhadra Dam
 Rajolibanda barrage
 Sunkesula barrage

Hydroelectric power stations
Krishna river is one of the rivers whose water energy is harnessed to a large extent by various hydro electric power stations in India. The following is the list of hydro electric power stations excluding small and medium installations.

Mineral deposits

Krishna river basin is endowed with rich mineral deposits such as oil & gas, coal, iron, limestone, dolomite, gold, granite, laterite, uranium, diamonds, etc. The following are the few noted deposits:

 Krishna Godavari Basin, oil & gas
 Yellandu, coal
 Bayyaram Mines, iron
 Kudremukh, iron
 Donimalai, iron
 Jaggayapeta mines, dolomite
 Nalgonda uranium deposits,
 Kollur Mine, diamonds
 Hatti Gold Mines,

Pollution

Most of the years, the river water is not joining the sea due to full utilisation of water mainly in agriculture. Closed river basin of Krishna means that the river ecosystem is on the verge of death. The river receives the waste from the large number of cities and the river basin population has increased to 80 million enhancing pollution load many folds into the river. Adequate average and minimum continuous environmental flows to the sea are not taking place in most of the years constricting salt export and leading to formation of saline and sodic alkaline soils in the lower reaches of the river basin. High alkalinity water is discharged from the ash dump areas of many coal fired power stations into the river which further increases the alkalinity of the river water whose water is naturally of high alkalinity since the river basin is draining vast area of basalt rock formations. The following are the few coal fired power stations located in the river basin

See also

 List of rivers of India
 Godavari River
 Soil salinity control
 Alkali soils
 Krishna Water Disputes Tribunal
 Upper Krishna Project
 Krishna (the deity)
 Krishna Pushkaralu
 Other rivers originating at Mahabaleshwar (Panchganga) Gayatri River, Koyna River, Savitri River and Venna River

References

External links 

 
Rivers of Andhra Pradesh
Rivers of Karnataka
Rivers of Maharashtra
Rivers of Telangana
Coromandel Coast
Rivers of India
Rivers of the Western Ghats